Yvette Henry Holt (born 1971) is an Aboriginal Australian poet, essayist, academic, researcher and editor, she heralds from the Bidjara, Yiman and Wakaman nations of Queensland. She is the youngest child born to prominent Aboriginal Elder, Albert Holt and Marlene Holt (née Henry), Holt interchanges with her mother's maiden name Henry for featured publications of her works. Holt came to prominence with her first multi-award-winning collection of poetry, Anonymous Premonition, published by the University of Queensland Press in 2008. Since 2009 Holt has lived and worked in Central Australia among the Central and Western Arrernte peoples of Hermansburg and Alice Springs.

Early Years and Education
Born 1971 in Brisbane, Yvette's family have lived in Inala East since 1968 where her family in particularly her father had contributed to Queensland education in primary, secondary and tertiary education, Queensland Police Service, Queensland Stolen Wages Class-Action, Brisbane Murri Court, Inala Elders, and the Southern Queensland Centre of Excellence in Aboriginal and Torres Strait Islander Primary Health Care. Yvette attended Serviceton Primary State School, now known as Durack State School, where she excelled at writing, singing and softball.

Holt graduated with a Bachelor of Arts in Adult Education and Community Management, at the University of Technology, Sydney UTS, Faculty of Business, 2007.

Poetry
In 2008, Holt's first collection of poetry (for which she had won the David Unaipon Award in 2005), Anonymous Premonition, was published by the University of Queensland Press. The award had granted  and also guaranteed publication of her work through the University of Queensland Press.

Her poems have since been published in dozens of journals, anthologies, short-story essays online and in traditional publications, as well Holt's poetry has been translated in multiple languages including Mandarin, French, Spanish, Indonesian, Italian and Dutch.

Other work and activities
She has undertaken research on Indigenous Australian literature, for the "Black Words" subset of AustLit, a resource for Australian literature published by the University of Queensland.

Holt has a keen interest in Indigenous social justice issues, especially for women, and has spoken around Australia and abroad on family and domestic violence. She mentors youth and also runs community workshops on writing and Indigenous Australian literature.

In 2009 she moved to Central Australia to live at Hermannsburg, Northern Territory, where she has been working as a teacher and researcher, working on the development of an employment strategy.

In 2019, Holt received one of three Norma Redpath Studio residencies, one of three awarded as part of that year's Hot Desk Fellowships awarded by the Wheeler Centre.

Current roles
Holt is currently the Executive Chairperson for the First Nations Australia Writers Network FNAWN, 2018. She is also a Board Director of AP Australian Poetry, 2019 – current, the peak-industry body for Australasian poetry, located at The Wheeler Centre, Melbourne.

Holt oversees publications between First Nations Australian writers, poets, and storytellers including the FN COVID-19 Anthology 2023 in association with AP Australian Poetry.

Editor, Holt co-edited the 2019 AP Anthology Volume 7.

Co-editor for the Borderless: A transnational anthology of feminist poetry 2021, published by Recent Work Press.

In recent years Yvette Henry Holt has advocated strongly toward the push for a nationally recognised Poet Laureate to the Commonwealth of Australia.

Recognition and awards
2003: UTS Human Rights Award in the category of Reconciliation for "outstanding contribution towards the elevation of social justice for Indigenous Australians"
2005: David Unaipon Award (in the Queensland Premier's Literary Awards) for an unpublished Indigenous Australian author, for Anonymous Premonition
 Other prizes for Anonymous Premonition after publication:
2008: Scanlon Prize for Indigenous Poetry
2008: Victorian Premier's Literary Award for Indigenous Writing
2010: Kate Challis RAKA Award
2018: "Mother(s) Native Tongue", Highly Commended in the 2018 Oodgeroo Noonuccal Indigenous Poetry Prize
2019: Recipient, Varuna Fellowship for her poetry manuscript "Hands of My Mother"
2019: Recipient, Neilma Sidney Literary Travel Fund

References

Further reading

External links

21st-century Australian poets
Indigenous Australian writers
Indigenous Australian academics
1971 births
Australian women poets
Living people